Artúr Somlay (28 February 1883, in Budapest – 10 November 1951, in Budapest) was a Hungarian stage and film actor.

Selected filmography
 Today and Tomorrow (1912)
 Faun (1918)
 Princess Woronzoff (1920)
 The Clan (1920)
 The Railway King (1921)
 The Adventuress of Monte Carlo (1921)
 The Riddle of the Sphinx (1921)
 Ilona (1921)
 Harvest (1936)
 Deadly Spring (1939)
 Duel for Nothing (1940)
 Végre! (1941)
 The Relative of His Excellency (1941)
 Valahol Európában (1948)
 Lúdas Matyi (1950)
 Különös házasság (1951)

Bibliography
 Simon, Andrew L. Made in Hungary: Hungarian Contributions to Universal Culture. Simon Publications, 1998.

External links

1883 births
1951 deaths
Hungarian male film actors
Hungarian male silent film actors
20th-century Hungarian male actors
Male actors from Budapest
1951 suicides
Drug-related suicides in Hungary
Alcohol-related deaths in Hungary